Mirman is a Jewish English surname. Notable people with the surname include: 

Edie Mirman, American actor, producer, and writer
Eugene Mirman, Russian-born American comedian and actor
Leonard Mirman, American mathematician and economist
Michele S. Mirman (born 1953), American trial lawyer
Simone Mirman, French-born English milliner

See also
The Mirman School, a school in Los Angeles, California

Surnames
Jewish surnames